Honor Club is an OTT streaming service owned by professional wrestling promotion Ring of Honor (ROH). Development of a VOD service was announced on November 9, 2017 by ROH COO Joe Koff. Honor Club was formally announced on February 2, 2018 and the service officially launched on February 19, 2018. Initially, Honor Club operated similarly to WWE Network and Impact Wrestling's Impact Plus, in that pay-per-view events were available to stream through the service.

When it began, Honor Club had a tiered pricing model that also offered discounts on merchandise and advances on ticket sales. The service had two tiers, both of which contained special discounts as well as access to the ROH TV archive. The basic tier, which included a 50% discount on pay-per-views, was available for a monthly subscription price of $9.99 or one annual payment of $99.99. The VIP subscription costed $119.99 annually and provided live-streaming access to all future pay-per-view events and access to the ROH PPV archive with no additional costs. 

On December 11, 2022, after ROH was acquired by AEW CEO Tony Khan, Honor Club was relaunched without any tiers, with payment being $9.99 a month for all subscribers. Pay-per-view events no longer stream on the relaunched service but rather are made available 90 days after they air on Bleacher Report. On January 18, 2023, a special event would be taped for Honor Club, serving as a tribute show for Jay Briscoe. Starting on March 2, 2023, ROH resumed airing its weekly series Ring of Honor Wrestling on Honor Club.

Honor Club is available online, through smart TVs and set-top boxes such as Roku and Apple TV, as well as via  mobile apps.

Programming

Current
All new episodes of Ring of Honor Wrestling 
All pay-per-view events (on-demand viewing)
All Honor Club exclusive events

Archive
All Live On Tour events
Select episodes of Ring of Honor Wrestling from 2011–2022
Select non-pay-per-view events from 2002–2021
Select non-ROH events
All In
CMLL 85th Anniversary Show
CMLL International Gran Prix 2018
CMLL 86th Anniversary Show

Past Honor Club exclusive events

2018

2019

2020

2021

2023

References

External links
 

Ring of Honor
2018 establishments in Maryland
Internet television channels
Internet properties established in 2018
Video on demand services
Professional wrestling streaming services